Eight malt whisky distilleries and a cooperage form the Malt Whisky Trail in Scotland's Speyside. Seven of the eight distilleries are in production and operational, whilst the Dallas Dhu distillery is a historic distillery. The Malt Whisky Trail is a local theme route marketing initiative, established to promote the region's whisky-related cultural heritage and encourage tourism.

Over half of Scotland's malt whisky distilleries are in Speyside, not all of which are open to the public. The heritage trail consists of the following Speyside single malt distilleries and a cooperage.
 Benromach
 Cardhu
 Dallas Dhu
 Glen Grant
 Glen Moray
 Glenfiddich
 The Glenlivet
 Speyside Cooperage
 Strathisla

A 2012 BBC article recommends a leisurely tour. "Though the distilleries are fairly close together, leisurely travellers may want to dedicate a few days to taking in the distinct traditions and lore at each stop.

References

External links
 
Interactive map of Speyside distilleries which are open to the public
 Spirit of Speyside Whisky Festival

Malt Whisky Trail
Tourist attractions in Moray
Tourist attractions in Highland (council area)
Whisky trails